The Sun Grant Association is a group of six U.S. universities that serve as regional centers of the Sun Grant Initiative, established by the U.S. Congress in the Sun Grant Research Initiative Act of 2003. They research and develop sustainable and environmentally friendly bio-based energy alternatives. The Department of Transportation, Department of Energy, and the Department of Agriculture are partners in the initiative. The centers were established at land-grant universities to serve different geographic regions of the United States, in the tradition of the Congress-established programs of sea-grant colleges in 1966 and space-grant colleges in 1988.

Participating institutions
The following six universities are classified as "national participants" and serve as regional centers.  Numerous universities participate within each region as "regional participants."

Pennsylvania State University hosts the Northeastern Center for the region composed of Connecticut, Delaware, District of Columbia, Massachusetts, Maryland, Maine, Michigan, New Hampshire, New Jersey, New York, Ohio, Pennsylvania, Rhode Island, Vermont, and West Virginia. 
Oklahoma State University hosts the South-Central Center for the region composed of Arkansas, Colorado, Kansas, Louisiana, Missouri, New Mexico, Oklahoma, and Texas. 
Oregon State University hosts the Western Center for the region composed of Arizona, California, Idaho, Nevada, Oregon, Utah, and Washington.
University of Hawaiʻi at Mānoa hosts the Western Insular Pacific Subcenter for the region composed of Alaska, Hawaii, Guam, American Samoa, the Northern Mariana Islands, Micronesia, the Marshall Islands, and the Republic of Palau.
South Dakota State University is the "National Lead Sun Grant Center" and hosts the North-Central Center for the region composed of Illinois, Indiana, Iowa, Minnesota, Montana, Nebraska, North Dakota, South Dakota, Wisconsin, and Wyoming. 
The University of Tennessee at Knoxville hosts the Southeastern Center for the region composed of Alabama, Florida, Georgia, Kentucky, Mississippi, North Carolina, South Carolina, Tennessee, Virginia, Puerto Rico, and the U.S. Virgin Islands.

See also
Land-grant university
National Sea Grant College Program
National Space Grant College and Fellowship Program

External links
 Sun Grant Research Initiative Act
 Sun Grant Project Report (pdf)
 North-Central Center (South Dakota State University)
 Northeastern Center (The Pennsylvania State University)
 South-Central Center (Oklahoma State University)
 Southeastern Center (University of Tennessee)
 Western Center (Oregon State University)

Biofuel in the United States

Lists of universities and colleges in the United States